Gamma Sigma Sigma is a national service sorority founded on October 12, 1952, at Beekman Tower in New York City. It partners with other organizations such as March of Dimes, National Coalition for Homeless Veterans, American Cancer Society, and Alex's Lemonade Stand Foundation. It has 53 active collegiate chapters and 18 active alumni chapters.

History

The weekend of October 10–12, 1952, student representatives of Boston University, Brooklyn College, Drexel Institute of Technology, Los Angeles City College, New York University, Queens College, University of Miami, and the University of Houston met at Beekman Tower in New York City. They decided on the name Gamma Sigma Sigma and the colors of Maroon and White, and charters were then given to these groups. As the group from University of Miami did not commit to membership at the founding meeting, they are not counted as a founding group.

a.  Sigma Lambda Phi from University of Miami did not attend the final day of convention. Eta Chapter was reserved for this group. They later joined as Upsilon Chapter in 1958.

Service and organizational structure
Collegiate and alumni chapters are required to perform a defined number of service hours during the year as defined in their individual bylaws. Chapters/individuals may receive awards for their service or for participating in special emphasis projects.

Collegiate chapters are led by an executive board with the following roles. President, Service Vice President, Membership Vice President, Treasurer, Recording Secretary, Corresponding Secretary, Financial Secretary, Public Relations Coordinator, National Representative, and Alumni Liaison. All are elected by the chapter except for the Parliamentarian, who is appointed by the President.

The sorority's national governing body is the National Convention, held biennially in odd-numbered years.  During each convention, the delegation elects the National Board of Directors, which coordinates the sorority's activities. The delegation also chooses two service project areas for emphasis during the next two years. All members are encouraged to participate in these areas in particular, known as project I.M.P.A.C.T. (Individuals Making Progress Across Communities Together). The current I.M.P.A.C.T. areas are Anti-bullying and Suicide Prevention and Invisible Disabilities and Diseases.

The sorority partners with other charitable organizations, with the longest standing partnership held by the March of Dimes. Other partners include: National Coalition for Homeless Veterans, American Cancer Society, and Alex's Lemonade Stand Foundation.

Membership
Gamma Sigma Sigma is not selective. The sorority does not discriminate based on race, sex, or gender nor do they tolerate hazing in any form. Membership is determined by guidelines set by each chapter, within guidelines set by the national organization and academic institution. These tasks are in direct relationship to both chapter and national service programs. Members-in-training are not required to perform personal services for members, or any activity that can be construed as hazing.  Gamma Sigma Sigma also accepts individuals who are members of other organizations, including social sororities, as members.

Controversy
On February 2, 2021, a post on Twitter detailed a series of racist, nationalist blog posts made by a member of the University of Georgia's (UGA) chapter of Gamma Sigma Sigma. One offending post stated the enslavement of Black people in the United States “does not begin to compare to” Sept. 11, 2001. Another post stated that Black people should not get their own holiday celebrating independence because “July 4th is about America. Not about race. Without America, the slaves would still be under British control and who knows how long slavery would’ve lasted.” Other members of the chapter were outraged by the posts and demanded that the offending member be removed from her executive leadership position in the chapter.

The issue was brought up in a February 9 chapter meeting which was attended by members of the sorority's national board. The national board members' efforts to impair the recall of the offending member along with the discovery that the national board had been informed about the hurtful posts months prior and had ignored them increased discontent within the UGA chapter.

In the month directly after the chapter meeting, the majority of the UGA chapter's members and all but one member of the executive board resigned. A new organization has since been created on UGA's campus focused on the same ideals of Gamma Sigma Sigma while also emphasizing inclusive practices.

National conventions

 The Woman of the Year also receives National Honorary membership.

Active chapters and colonies

As of February 18, 2023, Gamma Sigma Sigma has 38 active undergraduate chapters and 3 rechartering chapters. It has 42 Active Alumni chapters and colonies.

Notable alumni
Dr. Janette Hoston Harris - Alpha Delta - civil rights activist, DC Government Official
Jessye Norman - Alpha Eta - opera singer

National Honorary Members
Barbara Bush - National Honorary Member (1987)- first lady
Mae Jemison M.D. - National Honorary Member - first African-American woman to travel to space
P. Buckley Moss - National Honorary Member (1991) - Artist
Pat Mitchell - National Honorary Member (1993) - "Auntie Litter"
Ellen Ahlgren - National Honorary Member (1995) - Founder of ABC Quilts
Patricia Wetterling - National Honorary Member (1997) - Founder of the Jacob Wetterling Foundation
Karolyn Nunnallee -National Honorary Member (1999) - President of MADD
Beatrice Gaddy - National Honorary Member (2001) - Founder of Bea Gaddy's Family Center
Amy Callahan -National Honorary Member (2003) - Founder and President of the Better Days Foundation
Barbara Irvine - National Honorary Member (2005) - Founder of Alice Paul's Institute/Women's Rights
Liz Scott - National Honorary Member (2007) - Founder of Alex's Lemonade Stand
Ann McGee - National Honorary Member (2009) - Founder and National President of Miracle Flights for Kids
Enitan Doherty-Mason - National Honorary Member (2011) - Founder of Eduwatch
Paula Goldberg - National Honorary Member (2013) - Founder of the PACER Center
Carrie Newcomer - National Honorary Member (2015) - Singer

Chapter Honorary Members
Pat Nixon - Michigan State University honorary member - first lady.

External links
 Official Gamma Sigma Sigma Website

References

Student organizations established in 1952
Fraternities and sororities in the United States
Service organizations based in the United States
1952 establishments in New York City